South Brooklyn Community High School (SBCHS) is a public transfer high school in Red Hook, Brooklyn offering students who are truant or have dropped out a second chance to earn a high school diploma 

The school is a partnership between the NYCDOE and Good Shepherd Services, a youth development, education and family service agency.

References
Notes

External links
New York City Department of Education: South Brooklyn Community High School

Public high schools in Brooklyn